Gelénes is a village in Szabolcs-Szatmár-Bereg county, in the Northern Great Plain region of eastern Hungary.

Jews lived in Gelénes for many years and they had a Jewish cemetery that was apparently moved. During World War II nearly all of Jews from Gelénes were murdered in the Holocaust.

Geography

References

Populated places in Szabolcs-Szatmár-Bereg County
Jewish communities destroyed in the Holocaust